Senator Drane may refer to:

Herbert J. Drane (1863–1947), Florida State Senate
James Drane (1808–1869), Mississippi State Senate